Paeonia arietina, also known as the ram's horn peony, is a species of flowering plant within the family Paeoniaceae.

Description 
Paeonia arietina is a perennial species. Stems can range from 30 to 70 cm tall and usually possess glandular hairs. Flowers are solitary and rose in colour, with yellow anthers.

Distribution and habitat 
Paeonia arietina is native to: Albania, Bosnia-Herzegovina, Italy, North Caucasus, Romania, Turkey, Yugoslavia.

Paeonia arietina can be found in oak or coniferous woodlands, forest clearings and pastures. This species can be found at altitudes ranging from 300 to 2100 meters above sea level. It can grow on both limestone and granite soils, which suggests the species is adaptable to both acidic and alkaline soils.

References 

Peonies
Plants described in 1818
Flora of Albania
Flora of Bosnia and Herzegovina
Flora of Italy
Flora of Romania
Flora of Turkey
Flora of Yugoslavia